The 1926 Pittsburgh Pirates season was the 45th season of the Pittsburgh Pirates franchise. The defending World Series champion Pirates finished third in the National League with a record of 84–69.

Regular season

Season standings

Record vs. opponents

Game log

|- bgcolor="ffbbbb"
| 1 || April 13 || @ Cardinals || 6–7 || Rhem || Aldridge (0–1) || — || 17,000 || 0–1
|- bgcolor="ccffcc"
| 2 || April 14 || @ Cardinals || 10–3 || Kremer (1–0) || Bell || — || — || 1–1
|- bgcolor="ffbbbb"
| 3 || April 15 || @ Cardinals || 0–2 || Keen || Morrison (0–1) || — || — || 1–2
|- bgcolor="ffbbbb"
| 4 || April 16 || @ Cardinals || 2–3 || Sothoron || Sheehan (0–1) || — || — || 1–3
|- bgcolor="ffbbbb"
| 5 || April 17 || @ Reds || 3–4 || Donohue || Yde (0–1) || May || 5,500 || 1–4
|- bgcolor="ccffcc"
| 6 || April 18 || @ Reds || 3–1 || Aldridge (1–1) || Luque || — || 20,000 || 2–4
|- bgcolor="ffbbbb"
| 7 || April 19 || @ Reds || 1–2 || Mays || Kremer (1–1) || — || 2,000 || 2–5
|- bgcolor="ffbbbb"
| 8 || April 20 || @ Reds || 2–5 || Lucas || Morrison (0–2) || — || 4,700 || 2–6
|- bgcolor="ffbbbb"
| 9 || April 22 || Cardinals || 3–5 (10) || Keen || Morrison (0–3) || — || — || 2–7
|- bgcolor="ccffcc"
| 10 || April 23 || Cardinals || 3–2 || Aldridge (2–1) || Johnson || — || — || 3–7
|- bgcolor="ffbbbb"
| 11 || April 24 || Cardinals || 3–9 || Rhem || Kremer (1–2) || — || — || 3–8
|- bgcolor="ffbbbb"
| 12 || April 25 || @ Cubs || 3–4 || Bush || Yde (0–2) || — || — || 3–9
|- bgcolor="ccffcc"
| 13 || April 26 || @ Cubs || 8–6 || Meadows (1–0) || Piercy || Oldham (1) || — || 4–9
|- bgcolor="ccffcc"
| 14 || April 27 || @ Cubs || 2–0 || Morrison (1–3) || Alexander || — || — || 5–9
|- bgcolor="ccffcc"
| 15 || April 28 || @ Cubs || 9–4 || Aldridge (3–1) || Kaufmann || — || — || 6–9
|- bgcolor="ffbbbb"
| 16 || April 29 || Reds || 9–16 || Luque || Sheehan (0–2) || — || — || 6–10
|- bgcolor="ccffcc"
| 17 || April 30 || Reds || 13–4 || Meadows (2–0) || Mays || — || — || 7–10
|-

|- bgcolor="ccffcc"
| 18 || May 1 || Reds || 3–2 || Morrison (2–3) || Lucas || Kremer (1) || — || 8–10
|- bgcolor="ffbbbb"
| 19 || May 2 || @ Reds || 3–4 || Donohue || Aldridge (3–2) || — || 18,000 || 8–11
|- bgcolor="ccffcc"
| 20 || May 5 || Braves || 3–2 || Meadows (3–0) || Smith || — || — || 9–11
|- bgcolor="ffbbbb"
| 21 || May 6 || Braves || 1–3 || Wertz || Morrison (2–4) || Hearn || — || 9–12
|- bgcolor="ccffcc"
| 22 || May 7 || Braves || 11–10 (11) || Adams (1–0) || Benton || — || — || 10–12
|- bgcolor="ffbbbb"
| 23 || May 8 || Braves || 5–9 || Graham || Yde (0–3) || — || — || 10–13
|- bgcolor="ccffcc"
| 24 || May 11 || Phillies || 11–1 || Kremer (2–2) || Mitchell || — || — || 11–13
|- bgcolor="ccffcc"
| 25 || May 12 || Phillies || 14–3 || Meadows (4–0) || Knight || — || — || 12–13
|- bgcolor="ffbbbb"
| 26 || May 13 || Phillies || 0–6 || Carlson || Aldridge (3–3) || — || — || 12–14
|- bgcolor="ffffff"
| 27 || May 14 || Robins || 5–5 (7) ||  ||  || — || — || 12–14
|- bgcolor="ccffcc"
| 28 || May 15 || Robins || 2–0 || Morrison (3–4) || McGraw || — || — || 13–14
|- bgcolor="ccffcc"
| 29 || May 17 || Robins || 7–6 (12) || Oldham (1–0) || Ehrhardt || — || — || 14–14
|- bgcolor="ffffff"
| 30 || May 18 || Robins || 4–4 ||  ||  || — || — || 14–14
|- bgcolor="ccffcc"
| 31 || May 19 || Giants || 6–3 || Aldridge (4–3) || Scott || — || — || 15–14
|- bgcolor="ffbbbb"
| 32 || May 20 || Giants || 4–5 || Greenfield || Morrison (3–5) || Davies || 12,000 || 15–15
|- bgcolor="ccffcc"
| 33 || May 21 || Giants || 7–5 || Kremer (3–2) || Ring || — || — || 16–15
|- bgcolor="ccffcc"
| 34 || May 22 || Giants || 6–5 || Morrison (4–5) || Greenfield || — || 25,000 || 17–15
|- bgcolor="ccffcc"
| 35 || May 23 || @ Reds || 7–2 || Yde (1–3) || Donohue || — || 22,000 || 18–15
|- bgcolor="ffbbbb"
| 36 || May 24 || @ Cubs || 1–3 || Blake || Aldridge (4–4) || — || — || 18–16
|- bgcolor="ccffcc"
| 37 || May 25 || @ Cubs || 5–2 || Morrison (5–5) || Root || — || — || 19–16
|- bgcolor="ffbbbb"
| 38 || May 27 || Cubs || 2–5 || Kaufmann || Oldham (1–1) || — || — || 19–17
|- bgcolor="ccffcc"
| 39 || May 28 || Cubs || 6–5 (11) || Meadows (5–0) || Bush || — || — || 20–17
|- bgcolor="ccffcc"
| 40 || May 29 || Cubs || 9–7 || Adams (2–0) || Root || Oldham (2) || — || 21–17
|- bgcolor="ccffcc"
| 41 || May 30 || @ Reds || 4–3 || Meadows (6–0) || Luque || — || 16,000 || 22–17
|- bgcolor="ffbbbb"
| 42 || May 31 || Reds || 2–7 || Mays || Songer (0–1) || — || — || 22–18
|- bgcolor="ccffcc"
| 43 || May 31 || Reds || 9–5 || Morrison (6–5) || Lucas || — || — || 23–18
|-

|- bgcolor="ccffcc"
| 44 || June 3 || Cubs || 3–2 || Yde (2–3) || Root || — || — || 24–18
|- bgcolor="ccffcc"
| 45 || June 4 || Cubs || 5–1 || Meadows (7–0) || Bush || — || — || 25–18
|- bgcolor="ffbbbb"
| 46 || June 6 || @ Robins || 0–3 || Grimes || Aldridge (4–5) || — || 30,000 || 25–19
|- bgcolor="ccffcc"
| 47 || June 8 || @ Robins || 4–3 || Songer (1–1) || McWeeny || Kremer (2) || — || 26–19
|- bgcolor="ccffcc"
| 48 || June 9 || @ Phillies || 9–7 (10) || Kremer (4–2) || Knight || — || — || 27–19
|- bgcolor="ffbbbb"
| 49 || June 10 || @ Phillies || 9–13 || Mitchell || Adams (2–1) || — || — || 27–20
|- bgcolor="ffbbbb"
| 50 || June 11 || @ Phillies || 11–13 || Willoughby || Aldridge (4–6) || — || — || 27–21
|- bgcolor="ccffcc"
| 51 || June 12 || @ Phillies || 8–2 || Songer (2–1) || Carlson || — || — || 28–21
|- bgcolor="ffbbbb"
| 52 || June 14 || @ Braves || 2–3 || Benton || Yde (2–4) || Mogridge || — || 28–22
|- bgcolor="ccffcc"
| 53 || June 16 || @ Braves || 6–3 || Aldridge (5–6) || Genewich || — || — || 29–22
|- bgcolor="ffbbbb"
| 54 || June 17 || @ Giants || 5–6 (13) || Fitzsimmons || Adams (2–2) || — || — || 29–23
|- bgcolor="ccffcc"
| 55 || June 18 || @ Giants || 8–3 || Songer (3–1) || Scott || — || — || 30–23
|- bgcolor="ccffcc"
| 56 || June 19 || @ Giants || 4–2 || Kremer (5–2) || Ring || — || 30,000 || 31–23
|- bgcolor="ccffcc"
| 57 || June 20 || @ Giants || 8–0 || Aldridge (6–6) || Greenfield || — || 40,000 || 32–23
|- bgcolor="ccffcc"
| 58 || June 21 || Cardinals || 13–11 || Oldham (2–1) || Huntzinger || Kremer (3) || — || 33–23
|- bgcolor="ccffcc"
| 59 || June 22 || @ Cardinals || 3–1 || Meadows (8–0) || Keen || — || — || 34–23
|- bgcolor="ffbbbb"
| 60 || June 23 || @ Cardinals || 2–6 || Haines || Songer (3–2) || — || — || 34–24
|- bgcolor="ffffff"
| 61 || June 24 || @ Cardinals || 3–3 ||  ||  || — || — || 34–24
|- bgcolor="ffbbbb"
| 62 || June 25 || Reds || 8–9 || Lucas || Oldham (2–2) || — || — || 34–25
|- bgcolor="ffbbbb"
| 63 || June 26 || Reds || 1–9 || Mays || Meadows (8–1) || — || — || 34–26
|- bgcolor="ffbbbb"
| 64 || June 27 || @ Reds || 0–16 || Donohue || Songer (3–3) || — || 25,000 || 34–27
|- bgcolor="ffbbbb"
| 65 || June 28 || @ Reds || 1–6 || Rixey || Aldridge (6–7) || — || 5,500 || 34–28
|- bgcolor="ffbbbb"
| 66 || June 29 || @ Reds || 3–6 || Mays || Kremer (5–3) || — || 6,600 || 34–29
|- bgcolor="ffbbbb"
| 67 || June 30 || Cardinals || 2–6 || Haines || Meadows (8–2) || — || — || 34–30
|-

|- bgcolor="ccffcc"
| 68 || July 1 || Cardinals || 7–3 || Songer (4–3) || Rhem || Adams (1) || — || 35–30
|- bgcolor="ccffcc"
| 69 || July 2 || Cardinals || 3–2 || Kremer (6–3) || Alexander || — || — || 36–30
|- bgcolor="ccffcc"
| 70 || July 3 || Cardinals || 12–3 || Aldridge (7–7) || Bell || — || — || 37–30
|- bgcolor="ffbbbb"
| 71 || July 4 || @ Cubs || 0–2 || Root || Yde (2–5) || — || — || 37–31
|- bgcolor="ccffcc"
| 72 || July 5 || Cubs || 4–1 || Songer (5–3) || Kaufmann || Adams (2) || — || 38–31
|- bgcolor="ffbbbb"
| 73 || July 5 || Cubs || 7–10 || Piercy || Meadows (8–3) || Huntzinger || — || 38–32
|- bgcolor="ffbbbb"
| 74 || July 6 || Cubs || 0–3 || Blake || Bush (0–1) || — || — || 38–33
|- bgcolor="ccffcc"
| 75 || July 6 || Cubs || 3–2 (6) || Meadows (9–3) || Osborn || — || — || 39–33
|- bgcolor="ccffcc"
| 76 || July 7 || Phillies || 8–7 || Aldridge (8–7) || Dean || Kremer (4) || — || 40–33
|- bgcolor="ffbbbb"
| 77 || July 8 || Phillies || 6–10 || Ulrich || Adams (2–3) || — || — || 40–34
|- bgcolor="ccffcc"
| 78 || July 9 || Phillies || 9–6 || Meadows (10–3) || Mitchell || — || — || 41–34
|- bgcolor="ccffcc"
| 79 || July 10 || Phillies || 9–4 || Kremer (7–3) || Carlson || — || — || 42–34
|- bgcolor="ccffcc"
| 80 || July 12 || Giants || 6–3 || Aldridge (9–7) || Scott || — || 15,000 || 43–34
|- bgcolor="ffbbbb"
| 81 || July 14 || Giants || 8–12 || Ring || Songer (5–4) || — || — || 43–35
|- bgcolor="ffbbbb"
| 82 || July 14 || Giants || 2–5 || Fitzsimmons || Meadows (10–4) || — || 40,000 || 43–36
|- bgcolor="ccffcc"
| 83 || July 15 || Giants || 3–0 || Kremer (8–3) || Greenfield || — || — || 44–36
|- bgcolor="ccffcc"
| 84 || July 16 || Braves || 9–7 || Bush (1–1) || Smith || Songer (1) || — || 45–36
|- bgcolor="ffbbbb"
| 85 || July 17 || Braves || 7–9 || Goldsmith || Aldridge (9–8) || Mogridge || — || 45–37
|- bgcolor="ccffcc"
| 86 || July 19 || Braves || 10–4 || Meadows (11–4) || Genewich || — || — || 46–37
|- bgcolor="ccffcc"
| 87 || July 20 || Braves || 8–5 || Kremer (9–3) || Benton || Bush (1) || — || 47–37
|- bgcolor="ccffcc"
| 88 || July 21 || Robins || 1–0 || Songer (6–4) || Petty || — || — || 48–37
|- bgcolor="ffbbbb"
| 89 || July 21 || Robins || 2–6 || Vance || Aldridge (9–9) || — || 20,000 || 48–38
|- bgcolor="ccffcc"
| 90 || July 22 || Robins || 14–2 || Yde (3–5) || Barnes || — || — || 49–38
|- bgcolor="ccffcc"
| 91 || July 24 || Robins || 12–8 || Meadows (12–4) || Grimes || Songer (2) || — || 50–38
|- bgcolor="ccffcc"
| 92 || July 24 || Robins || 3–2 || Kremer (10–3) || McGraw || — || 25,000 || 51–38
|- bgcolor="ffbbbb"
| 93 || July 25 || @ Robins || 1–3 || Petty || Bush (1–2) || — || 20,000 || 51–39
|- bgcolor="ccffcc"
| 94 || July 26 || @ Robins || 3–2 || Yde (4–5) || Vance || Adams (3) || — || 52–39
|- bgcolor="ccffcc"
| 95 || July 27 || @ Giants || 4–3 || Songer (7–4) || Barnes || Kremer (5) || — || 53–39
|- bgcolor="ccffcc"
| 96 || July 28 || @ Giants || 6–0 || Meadows (13–4) || Scott || — || 10,000 || 54–39
|- bgcolor="ffbbbb"
| 97 || July 30 || @ Phillies || 1–6 || Carlson || Kremer (10–4) || — || — || 54–40
|- bgcolor="ccffcc"
| 98 || July 31 || @ Phillies || 10–5 || Yde (5–5) || Mitchell || — || — || 55–40
|-

|- bgcolor="ffbbbb"
| 99 || August 2 || @ Phillies || 3–8 || Dean || Songer (7–5) || — || — || 55–41
|- bgcolor="ccffcc"
| 100 || August 3 || @ Phillies || 14–2 || Bush (2–2) || Ulrich || — || — || 56–41
|- bgcolor="ffbbbb"
| 101 || August 4 || @ Braves || 0–14 || Smith || Aldridge (9–10) || — || — || 56–42
|- bgcolor="ccffcc"
| 102 || August 4 || @ Braves || 5–2 || Meadows (14–4) || Benton || — || — || 57–42
|- bgcolor="ccffcc"
| 103 || August 5 || @ Braves || 4–3 || Kremer (11–4) || Goldsmith || — || — || 58–42
|- bgcolor="ccffcc"
| 104 || August 6 || @ Braves || 5–4 || Yde (6–5) || Genewich || Aldridge (1) || — || 59–42
|- bgcolor="ffbbbb"
| 105 || August 7 || @ Braves || 0–2 || Wertz || Songer (7–6) || — || — || 59–43
|- bgcolor="ffbbbb"
| 106 || August 7 || @ Braves || 0–2 (8) || Smith || Bush (2–3) || — || — || 59–44
|- bgcolor="ccffcc"
| 107 || August 9 || @ Robins || 9–3 || Kremer (12–4) || Petty || — || — || 60–44
|- bgcolor="ccffcc"
| 108 || August 10 || @ Robins || 10–2 || Meadows (15–4) || McWeeny || — || — || 61–44
|- bgcolor="ffbbbb"
| 109 || August 11 || @ Robins || 2–4 || Vance || Aldridge (9–11) || McGraw || — || 61–45
|- bgcolor="ccffcc"
| 110 || August 18 || Braves || 4–1 || Kremer (13–4) || Smith || — || — || 62–45
|- bgcolor="ffbbbb"
| 111 || August 18 || Braves || 3–4 || Wertz || Meadows (15–5) || — || — || 62–46
|- bgcolor="ffbbbb"
| 112 || August 19 || Phillies || 1–3 (10) || Carlson || Songer (7–7) || — || — || 62–47
|- bgcolor="ccffcc"
| 113 || August 19 || Phillies || 4–0 || Yde (7–5) || Ulrich || — || — || 63–47
|- bgcolor="ccffcc"
| 114 || August 21 || Phillies || 4–2 || Bush (3–3) || Dean || — || — || 64–47
|- bgcolor="ccffcc"
| 115 || August 21 || Phillies || 8–5 || Kremer (14–4) || Knight || — || — || 65–47
|- bgcolor="ffbbbb"
| 116 || August 23 || Robins || 3–7 || Petty || Meadows (15–6) || — || — || 65–48
|- bgcolor="ccffcc"
| 117 || August 23 || Robins || 10–2 || Yde (8–5) || Barnes || — || — || 66–48
|- bgcolor="ccffcc"
| 118 || August 24 || Robins || 10–1 || Kremer (15–4) || Grimes || — || — || 67–48
|- bgcolor="ffbbbb"
| 119 || August 25 || Robins || 1–2 || McGraw || Aldridge (9–12) || — || — || 67–49
|- bgcolor="ccffcc"
| 120 || August 26 || Giants || 15–7 || Meadows (16–6) || Fitzsimmons || Morrison (1) || — || 68–49
|- bgcolor="ccffcc"
| 121 || August 27 || Giants || 4–0 || Bush (4–3) || Barnes || — || — || 69–49
|- bgcolor="ccffcc"
| 122 || August 28 || Giants || 8–7 || Meadows (17–6) || Greenfield || Morrison (2) || — || 70–49
|- bgcolor="ffffff"
| 123 || August 29 || @ Cardinals || 2–2 (10) ||  ||  || — || 40,000 || 70–49
|- bgcolor="ccffcc"
| 124 || August 30 || @ Cardinals || 3–0 || Kremer (16–4) || Rhem || — || — || 71–49
|- bgcolor="ffbbbb"
| 125 || August 30 || @ Cardinals || 3–5 || Haines || Bush (4–4) || — || — || 71–50
|- bgcolor="ffbbbb"
| 126 || August 31 || @ Cardinals || 1–6 || Sherdel || Meadows (17–7) || — || — || 71–51
|- bgcolor="ffbbbb"
| 127 || August 31 || @ Cardinals || 1–2 || Sothoron || Morrison (6–6) || — || 23,279 || 71–52
|-

|- bgcolor="ffbbbb"
| 128 || September 1 || @ Cardinals || 2–5 || Reinhart || Kremer (16–5) || — || 20,000 || 71–53
|- bgcolor="ccffcc"
| 129 || September 3 || @ Cubs || 3–2 (10) || Hill (1–0) || Kaufmann || — || — || 72–53
|- bgcolor="ffbbbb"
| 130 || September 4 || @ Cubs || 2–11 || Bush || Bush (4–5) || — || — || 72–54
|- bgcolor="ffbbbb"
| 131 || September 4 || @ Cubs || 2–3 || Jones || Koupal (0–1) || — || — || 72–55
|- bgcolor="ffbbbb"
| 132 || September 5 || @ Cubs || 6–7 (6) || Osborn || Songer (7–8) || Huntzinger || 16 || 72–56
|- bgcolor="ffbbbb"
| 133 || September 6 || Cardinals || 1–8 || Rhem || Morrison (6–7) || — || — || 72–57
|- bgcolor="ccffcc"
| 134 || September 6 || Cardinals || 4–2 || Kremer (17–5) || Sothoron || — || — || 73–57
|- bgcolor="ffbbbb"
| 135 || September 7 || Cardinals || 0–8 || Sherdel || Aldridge (9–13) || — || — || 73–58
|- bgcolor="ccffcc"
| 136 || September 8 || Reds || 6–1 || Meadows (18–7) || Donohue || — || — || 74–58
|- bgcolor="ccffcc"
| 137 || September 8 || Reds || 11–0 || Hill (2–0) || Luque || — || — || 75–58
|- bgcolor="ccffcc"
| 138 || September 9 || Cubs || 2–1 || Bush (5–5) || Jones || — || — || 76–58
|- bgcolor="ffbbbb"
| 139 || September 9 || Cubs || 1–10 || Kaufmann || Koupal (0–2) || — || — || 76–59
|- bgcolor="ccffcc"
| 140 || September 10 || Reds || 5–2 || Kremer (18–5) || Rixey || — || — || 77–59
|- bgcolor="ffbbbb"
| 141 || September 10 || Reds || 2–5 || Lucas || Morrison (6–8) || — || — || 77–60
|- bgcolor="ffbbbb"
| 142 || September 11 || Reds || 6–10 || Mays || Hill (2–1) || — || — || 77–61
|- bgcolor="ccffcc"
| 143 || September 12 || @ Giants || 5–1 || Aldridge (10–13) || Fitzsimmons || Bush (2) || — || 78–61
|- bgcolor="ccffcc"
| 144 || September 12 || @ Giants || 7–1 || Meadows (19–7) || Greenfield || — || 40,000 || 79–61
|- bgcolor="ffbbbb"
| 145 || September 13 || @ Giants || 5–9 || Ring || Hill (2–2) || Davies || — || 79–62
|- bgcolor="ccffcc"
| 146 || September 14 || @ Giants || 5–0 || Kremer (19–5) || McQuillan || — || — || 80–62
|- bgcolor="ffbbbb"
| 147 || September 15 || @ Giants || 5–6 || Scott || Bush (5–6) || — || — || 80–63
|- bgcolor="ffbbbb"
| 148 || September 16 || @ Robins || 1–2 || Barnes || Meadows (19–8) || — || — || 80–64
|- bgcolor="ffbbbb"
| 149 || September 17 || @ Robins || 1–3 || Vance || Hill (2–3) || — || — || 80–65
|- bgcolor="ffbbbb"
| 150 || September 18 || @ Robins || 1–3 || McWeeny || Yde (8–6) || — || — || 80–66
|- bgcolor="ccffcc"
| 151 || September 19 || @ Robins || 7–4 || Kremer (20–5) || Grimes || — || 20,000 || 81–66
|- bgcolor="ccffcc"
| 152 || September 20 || @ Phillies || 4–0 || Bush (6–6) || Willoughby || — || — || 82–66
|- bgcolor="ffbbbb"
| 153 || September 21 || @ Phillies || 2–7 || Mitchell || Meadows (19–9) || — || — || 82–67
|- bgcolor="ccffcc"
| 154 || September 22 || @ Phillies || 9–3 || Hill (3–3) || Dean || — || — || 83–67
|- bgcolor="ffbbbb"
| 155 || September 23 || @ Braves || 1–2 || Edwards || Kremer (20–6) || Benton || — || 83–68
|- bgcolor="ccffcc"
| 156 || September 25 || @ Braves || 11–8 || Meadows (20–9) || Mogridge || Bush (3) || — || 84–68
|- bgcolor="ffbbbb"
| 157 || September 25 || @ Braves || 2–5 || Genewich || Yde (8–7) || — || — || 84–69
|-

|-
| Legend:       = Win       = Loss       = TieBold = Pirates team member

Detailed records

Opening Day lineup

Roster

Player stats

Batting

Starters by position 
Note: Pos = Position; G = Games played; AB = At bats; H = Hits; Avg. = Batting average; HR = Home runs; RBI = Runs batted in

Other batters 
Note: G = Games played; AB = At bats; H = Hits; Avg. = Batting average; HR = Home runs; RBI = Runs batted in

Pitching

Starting pitchers 
Note: G = Games pitched; IP = Innings pitched; W = Wins; L = Losses; ERA = Earned run average; SO = Strikeouts

Other pitchers 
Note: G = Games pitched; IP = Innings pitched; W = Wins; L = Losses; ERA = Earned run average; SO = Strikeouts

Relief pitchers 
Note: G = Games pitched; W = Wins; L = Losses; SV = Saves; ERA = Earned run average; SO = Strikeouts

References 

 1926 Pittsburgh Pirates team page at Baseball Reference
 1926 Pittsburgh Pirates Page at Baseball Almanac

Pittsburgh Pirates seasons
Pittsburgh Pirates season
Pittsburg Pir